The Burning Question is a 1943 Danish drama film directed by Alice O'Fredericks and starring Poul Reumert and Grethe Holmer. Based upon the Thit Jensen's stage play, the film places serious focus on abortion and its consequences. It was one of the first Danish films to highlight the issue of women and women's rights.

Cast
 Poul Reumert as Professor Eigil Thomsen
 Grethe Holmer as Aase Thomsen
 Maria Garland as Sygeplejerske / Sekretær Anina Bagge
 Richard Christensen as Overretssagfører Edvard Holm
 Katy Valentin as Fru Emilie Holm
 Poul Reichhardt as Hugo Holm
 Bodil Kjer as Bodil Kragh
 Sigrid Horne-Rasmussen as Dagmar 'Dax' Eriksen
 Carl Heger as Landsretssagfører Carsten Brandt
 Eyvind Johan-Svendsen as Politiadvokat Hannes Berg
 Peter Nielsen as Retsformand
 Clara Schwartz as Civil dommer
 Asbjørn Andersen as Dommer

References

External links

1943 films
1940s Danish-language films
1943 drama films
Danish black-and-white films
Films directed by Alice O'Fredericks
Films scored by Sven Gyldmark
Danish drama films
Danish films based on plays